The 1999 Bremen state election was held on 6 June 1999 to elect the members of the Bürgerschaft of Bremen, as well as the city councils of Bremen and Bremerhaven. The incumbent grand coalition of the Social Democratic Party (SPD) and Christian Democratic Union (CDU) led by Mayor Henning Scherf retained its majority and continued in office.

Parties
The table below lists parties represented in the previous Bürgerschaft of Bremen.

Election result

|-
! colspan="2" | Party
! Votes
! %
! +/-
! Seats
! +/-
! Seats %
|-
| bgcolor=| 
| align=left | Social Democratic Party (SPD)
| align=right| 123,875
| align=right| 42.6
| align=right| 9.2
| align=right| 47
| align=right| 10
| align=right| 47.0
|-
| bgcolor=| 
| align=left | Christian Democratic Union (CDU)
| align=right| 108,050
| align=right| 37.1
| align=right| 4.5
| align=right| 42
| align=right| 5
| align=right| 42.0
|-
| bgcolor=| 
| align=left | Alliance 90/The Greens (Grüne)
| align=right| 25,958
| align=right| 8.9
| align=right| 4.2
| align=right| 10
| align=right| 4
| align=right| 10.0
|-
| bgcolor=| 
| align=left | German People's Union (DVU)
| align=right| 8,823
| align=right| 3.0
| align=right| 0.5
| align=right| 1
| align=right| 1
| align=right| 1.0
|-
! colspan=8|
|-
| bgcolor=| 
| align=left | Party of Democratic Socialism (PDS)
| align=right| 8,418
| align=right| 2.9
| align=right| 0.5
| align=right| 0
| align=right| ±0
| align=right| 0
|-
| bgcolor=| 
| align=left | Free Democratic Party (FDP)
| align=right| 7,327
| align=right| 2.5
| align=right| 0.9
| align=right| 0
| align=right| ±0
| align=right| 0
|-
| bgcolor=#63B8FF| 
| align=left | Labour for Bremen and Bremerhaven (AFB)
| align=right| 7,110
| align=right| 2.4
| align=right| 8.3
| align=right| 0
| align=right| 12
| align=right| 0
|-
| bgcolor=|
| align=left | Others
| align=right| 1,530
| align=right| 0.5
| align=right| 
| align=right| 0
| align=right| ±0
| align=right| 0
|-
! align=right colspan=2| Total
! align=right| 291,091
! align=right| 100.0
! align=right| 
! align=right| 100
! align=right| ±0
! align=right| 
|-
! align=right colspan=2| Voter turnout
! align=right| 
! align=right| 60.1
! align=right| 8.5
! align=right| 
! align=right| 
! align=right| 
|}

References
 The Federal Returning Officer

Elections in Bremen (state)
Bremen
June 1999 events in Europe